Zinnia is a genus of plants of the tribe Heliantheae within the family Asteraceae.  They are native to scrub and dry grassland in an area stretching from the Southwestern United States to South America, with a centre of diversity in Mexico.  Members of the genus are notable for their solitary long-stemmed 12 petal flowers that come in a variety of bright colors. The genus name honors German master botanist Johann Gottfried Zinn (1727–59).

Description
Zinnias are annuals, shrubs, and sub-shrubs native primarily to North America, with a few species in South America. Most species have upright stems but some have a lax habit with spreading stems that mound over the surface of the ground. They typically range in height from 10 to 100 cm tall (4" to 40"). The leaves are opposite and usually stalkless (sessile), with a shape ranging from linear to ovate, and a color ranging from pale to medium green. Zinnia's composite flowers consist of ray florets that surround disk florets, which may be a different color than the ray florets and mature from the periphery inward. The flowers have a range of appearances, from a single row of petals to a dome shape. Zinnias may be white, chartreuse, yellow, orange, red, purple, or lilac.

Cultivation
Zinnias are easy to grow with potential heavy blooms that gush in color. Their petals can take different forms as single row with a visible center (Single-flowered zinnia), numerous rows with a center that is not visible (Double-flowered) and petals that are somewhere in-between with numerous rows but visible centers (Semi double-flowered zinnia). Their flowers can also take several shapes.

Zinnias are an annual plant that preferably grows in situ from seed, as they dislike being transplanted. Much like daisies, zinnias prefer to have full sunlight and adequate water. In the preferred conditions they will grow quickly but are sensitive to frost and therefore will die after the first frost of autumn. Zinnias benefit from deadheading to encourage further blooming.

Species
 Accepted species
 Zinnia acerosa – Arizona, New Mexico, Texas, and Utah in the United States; Coahuila, Durango, Michoacán, Nuevo León, San Luis Potosí, Sonora, and Zacatecas in Mexico.
 Zinnia americana – Chiapas, Guerrero, Honduras, Jalisco, Michoacán, México State, Nayarit, Nicaragua, Oaxaca, and Veracruz.
 Zinnia angustifolia – Chihuahua, Durango, Jalisco, San Luis Potosí, and Sinaloa.
 Zinnia anomala – Texas; Coahuila, and Nuevo León.
 Zinnia bicolor – Chihuahua, Durango, Guanajuato, Jalisco, Nayarit, and Sinaloa.
 Zinnia citrea – Chihuahua, Coahuila, and San Luis Potosí.
 Zinnia elegans  from Jalisco to Paraguay; naturalized in parts of United States.
 Zinnia flavicoma – Guerrero, Jalisco, Michoacán, and Oaxaca.
 Zinnia grandiflora – Arizona, Colorado, Kansas, New Mexico, Oklahoma, and Texas; Chihuahua, Coahuila, Nuevo León, Sonora, and Tamaulipas.
 Zinnia haageana – Guanajuato, Jalisco, México State, Michoacán, and Oaxaca.
 Zinnia juniperifolia – Coahuila, Nuevo León, and Tamaulipas.
 Zinnia maritima – Colima, Guerrero, Jalisco, Nayarit, and Sinaloa.
 Zinnia microglossa – Guanajuato and Jalisco.
 Zinnia oligantha – Coahuila.
 Zinnia palmeri – Colima, Jalisco
 Zinnia pauciflora Phil.
 Zinnia peruviana – widespread from Chihuahua to Paraguay including Galápagos and West Indies; naturalized in parts of China, South Africa, and the United States.
 Zinnia pumila A.Gray
 Zinnia purpusii – Chiapas, Colima, Guerrero, Jalisco, and Puebla.
 Zinnia tenuis – Chihuahua.
 Zinnia venusta – Guerrero.
 Zinnia zinnioides (Kunth) Olorode & Torres

 formerly included
see Glossocardia Philactis
 Zinnia bidens – Glossocardia bidens
 Zinnia liebmannii – Philactis zinnioides

Zinnia elegans, also known as Zinnia violacea, is the most familiar species, originally from the warm regions of Mexico being a warm–hot climate plant. Its leaves are lance-shaped and sandpapery in texture, and height ranges from 15 cm to 1 meter.

Zinnia angustifolia is another Mexican species.  It has a low bushy plant habit, linear foliage, and more delicate flowers than Z. elegans – usually single, and in shades of yellow, orange or white.  It is also more resistant to powdery mildew than Z. elegans, and hybrids between the two species have been raised which impart this resistance on plants intermediate in appearance between the two.  The Profusion series, with both single and double-flowered components, is bred by Sakata of Japan, and is among the most well-known of this hybrid group.

Zinnias seem to be a favorite of butterflies as well as hummingbirds, and many gardeners add zinnias specifically to attract them.

Uses
Zinnias are popular garden flowers because they come in a wide range of flower colors and shapes, and they can withstand hot summer temperatures and are easy to grow from seeds.  They are grown in fertile, humus-rich, and well-drained soil, in an area with full sun. They will reseed themselves each year. Over 100 cultivars have been produced since selective breeding started in the 19th century.

Zinnia peruviana was introduced to Europe in the early 1700s. Around 1790 Z. elegans (Zinnia violacea) was introduced and those plants had a single row of ray florets, which were violet. In 1829, scarlet flowering plants were available under the name "Coccinea". Double flowering types were available in 1858, coming from India, and they were in a range of colors, including shades of reds, rose, purple, orange, buff, and rose stripped. In time, they came to represent thinking of absent friends in the language of flowers.

A number of species of zinnia are popular flowering plants, and interspecific hybrids are becoming more common. Their varied habits allow for uses in several parts of a garden, and their tendency to attract butterflies and hummingbirds is seen as desirable. Commercially available seeds and plants are derived from open pollinated or F1 crosses, and the first commercial F1 hybrid dates from 1960.

Some zinnia are edible.

Beyond earth

Experimentation aboard the International Space Station has demonstrated the capability of zinnias to grow and blossom in a weightless environment.

Companion plants
In the Americas their ability to attract hummingbirds is also seen as useful as a defense against whiteflies, and therefore zinnias are a desirable companion plant, benefiting plants that are inter-cropped with it. Zinnias are grown in the summertime and bloom all summer long.

Gallery

See also 
 Arthur B. Howard

References

External links 

 
Asteraceae genera
Butterfly food plants
Taxa named by Carl Linnaeus